Sacagawea Peak is the highest mountain in the Bridger Range in south-western Montana.  The peak is named for Sacagawea, a Lemhi Shoshone woman that accompanied the Lewis and Clark Expedition.

Recreation 
The mountain is a popular hiking destination.  The main trailhead starts at 7,788 feet and climbs 1,800 feet reaching the summit in 2 miles.  The mountain holds snow in chutes through the early summer and local skiers often ski there through August.

References 

Mountains of Montana
Sacagawea